The CNA C.II was a small, air-cooled, two cylinder horizontally opposed aircraft engine designed and built in Italy in the late 1930s.

Design
The low power, unsupercharged C.II had offset cylinders with special steel barrels and light alloy cylinder heads.  The pistons were light alloy castings; the connecting rods were heat treated chrome-nickel steel, with split big ends. The CN.II had a one piece chrome-nickel steel crankshaft running in two roller bearings, with a ball thrust bearing.  The crankcase was a one piece light alloy casting.

Applications
Data from  Erickson
Alaparma AM-8
Alaparma AM-9
Alaparma AM-10
Partenavia P.53 Aeroscooter

Specifications

References

1930s aircraft piston engines
CNA aircraft engines